Saturday Fiction is a 2019 Chinese drama film directed by Lou Ye. Written by Yingli Ma and starring Gong Li, Mark Chao, and Joe Odagiri, it was selected to compete for the Golden Lion at the 76th Venice International Film Festival. The film had its premiere on 4 September 2019 at the festival.

Cast
 Gong Li as Yu Jin
 Mark Chao
 Joe Odagiri
 Pascal Greggory as Frédéric Hubert
 Tom Wlaschiha as Saul Speyer
 Huang Xiangli
 Wang Chuanjun
 Ayumu Nakajima
 Zhang Songwen

Release
The film was selected to compete for the Golden Lion at the 76th Venice International Film Festival, where it had premiere on 4 September 2019. Later that month the film played at the 57th New York Film Festival It was also selected as closing film of 11th Beijing International Film Festival to be screened on 29 September 2021.

References

External links
 

2019 films
2019 drama films
Chinese drama films
Films directed by Lou Ye
2010s Mandarin-language films